X-Scream is a ride at the top of the Strat SkyPod in Las Vegas, Nevada. The name of the ride is a play on the word extreme.

Ride experience
X-Scream consists of a  straight piece of track similar to that of a conventional roller coaster, which carries a single open top car. This trackway pivots vertically in a see-saw motion, letting the car roll backward and forward along the length. The ride car is allowed to roll quickly forward to the end of the track,  past the edge of the building, before braking sharply. The rolling back and forth of the car and the rocking of the track is programmed to take the rider by surprise and feel like they are at risk of falling from the precipice of the building.

See also
 Big Shot (ride)
 High Roller (Stratosphere)
 SkyJump Las Vegas

References 

Tourist attractions in Las Vegas
Buildings and structures in Las Vegas